Honkin' on Bobo is the fourteenth studio album by American rock band Aerosmith, released on March 30, 2004, by Columbia Records. The album includes 11 covers of blues and blues rock songs from the 1950s and 1960s, with one new song, "The Grind". The album pays tribute to Aerosmith's earliest influences and showcases a rawer sound when compared to their more recent commercial efforts. Honkin' on Bobo was produced by Jack Douglas, who was Aerosmith's producer on a vast majority of their 1970s output.

The album sold over 160,000 copies in its first week, reaching number five on the Billboard 200. Honkin' on Bobo was certified gold by the Recording Industry Association of America on May 11, 2004.

Background
After their departure from Geffen Records in 1994, the band wanted their next record to be a blues album. "Then," said singer Steven Tyler, "we caught wind that Clapton was doing it, and we went, 'Fuck!'… We did such incredible research for this album, too… We also thought about our roots, about paying homage to the stuff we loved: early Yardbirds and all. Some of Little Walter's early stuff. Really obscure names… I did some digging around myself in Chicago. We had some great songs to work with – and then Clapton came along and did it."

Honkin' on Bobo was recorded in Joe Perry's ranch near Boston, with the band committing to playing only when they were in a good mood. "We wanted to do something we haven't done before and that excites us," Perry said. "That's what makes us want to do another record. Otherwise, we'd say, 'OK, we've done everything we can do, so why bother even going in again?’" 

The album title was suggested by Tyler, who had heard the phrase before, possibly the song by Canadian country/bluegrass band The Good Brothers, and amused the band with it. Perry stated during a radio interview, "We just know that it's a phrase that sounds... jazzish, nastyish, so it works for us."

Many tracks feature harmonica by Tyler, including Little Walter's "Temperature". This was played on an episode of the House of Blues Radio Hour that was about the harmonica. A harmonica keychain was included with the limited edition version. Provisional artwork featured the cover's harmonica stuffed into a model's denim cutoffs. This was vetoed, said its proponent Tyler, "because I'm in a band with four other guys."

"Stop Messin' Around" – a Fleetwood Mac cover, sung by Perry – had never before appeared on an Aerosmith album, despite being a staple of the band's concerts for more than ten years.

Reception

Metacritic gave the album a score of 69 out of 100 based on 12 generally favorable reviews. Stephen Thomas Erlewine of AllMusic said that the album is the best the band has done since Pump in 1989, and that it cannot be called a "blues" album because it is a rock album. He called the album a "surprise" in that, even though the album's artwork and title are bad, it marks a return to Aerosmith. In his Blender magazine review of the album, Jon Pareles said that the band did their blues album different from most others because, instead of making "respectable" cover versions, they make quite unrespectable cover versions like "You Gotta Move". The album, to him, proves that Aerosmith can still rock. Chris Willman of Entertainment Weekly felt that the album didn't live up to what it should be because it is too loud, but some songs on the album are good.

David Fricke of Rolling Stone magazine wrote an article for the magazine comparing and contrasting Aerosmith's Honkin' on Bobo and Eric Clapton's Me and Mr. Johnson which also explored blues influences. He said that Clapton's album was mostly about pain, while Aerosmith's album was about sex and running away from lovers. He also considers Bobo to be a double-tribute album – one tribute to the original musicians and one tribute for 1960s blues-rock bands – and considers the album to be overdone, which is what Aerosmith is good at.

Track listing
Per liner notes:

Personnel
Per liner notes:
Steven Tyler – lead vocals, harmonica, piano on "Never Loved a Girl", backing vocals on "Stop Messin' Around", percussion, production
Joe Perry – lead guitar, backing vocals, lead vocals on "Back Back Train" and "Stop Messin' Around", production
Brad Whitford – rhythm and lead guitar
Tom Hamilton – bass guitar
Joey Kramer – drums 
Additional musicians
Tracy Bonham – vocals on "Back Back Train" and "Jesus Is on the Main Line"
Johnnie Johnson – piano on "Shame, Shame, Shame" and "Temperature"
The Memphis Horns – brass on "Never Loved a Girl"
Paul Santo – piano, electric piano, organ, engineering
Production
Jack Douglas – production
Paul Caruso – engineering
Jay Messina – engineering
Bob Ludwig – mastering
Marti Frederiksen – production, mixing, engineering

Charts

Weekly charts

Year-end charts

Certifications

References

Sources

Aerosmith albums
Covers albums
2004 albums
Albums produced by Jack Douglas (record producer)
Albums produced by Marti Frederiksen
Columbia Records albums